Mary Crowley may refer to:
 Mary C. Crowley, founder and CEO of Home Interiors and Gifts, Inc
 Mary Catherine Crowley, American author of poems and novels
 Mary Frances Crowley, Irish educator and nurse
 Mary Medd, née Crowley, British architect